Pakṣilasvāmin Vātsyāyana was an Indian philosopher, commentator and logician of the Nyaya School. He is the author of the Commentary, "Nyāya", the first full commentary on the Nyāya-sūtra of Gautama (c. 150 CE), which is itself the foundational text of the school of philosophy called 
"Nyāya".

Works
The Nyayabhasya is the first commentary on the Nyaya sutras that is still extant, and the first to which we find any reference. Vātsyāyana's commentary sets the agenda for much of Nyāya's philosophical developments throughout its history. His theory of knowledge gives special attention to the nature and importance of cognition as a guide to action. This theme informs several elements of his project, including his realism, his account of epistemic entitlement, and his notion of philosophy's contribution to living well.

References

See also
 Nyaya
 Nyaya Sutras

Indian logicians
Indian philosophers
Year of birth unknown
Year of death unknown